Tempted is a 2018 South Korean television series starring Woo Do-hwan, Park Soo-young, Kim Min-jae, and Moon Ga-young. It is loosely based on the 1782 French novel Les Liaisons dangereuses by Pierre Choderlos de Laclos. The series aired from March 12 to May 1, 2018 on MBC TV's Mondays and Tuesdays at 22:00 (KST) time slot for 32 episodes.

Synopsis
A romantic melodrama that depicts the lives of a young man and woman who begin to discover their true feelings whilst playing the dangerous game of love. The show is based on the classic 18th-century French novel Les Liaisons Dangereuses by Pierre Choderlos de Laclos.  

Student president Choi Su-ji (Moon Ga Young), Kwon Si-hyeon (Woo Do-hwan) eldest heir of the JK Group, and casanova Lee Se-ju (Kim Min-jae) have been best friends since childhood. Su-ji’s current boyfriend, Lee Ki-young (Lee Jae-kyun) humiliates her and her mother for trying to use him to climb up the social ladder and breaks up with her. As the last straw, when Su-ji's mother and Si-hyeon’s father announce their engagement, the trio devise a plan to hit two birds with one stone.

Eun Tae-hui (Park Soo-young) is a hardworking female college student who no longer believes in love after watching the demise of her parents' marriage. Su-ji finds out that Tae-hui is Ki-young's first love, and asks Si-hyeon to seduce Tae-hui and then break her heart, as a way to prove his loyalty to Su-ji. After proving which, Su-ji and Si-hyeon will marry to prevent their parents from doing so themselves.

However, all does not go as planned, when Si-hyeon and Tae-hui begin to actually fall for each other. The strain this puts on the trio's friendship, Tae-hui's reaction after seeing their true faces and Ki-young’s thirst for revenge make up the rest of this drama.

Cast

Main
 Woo Do-hwan as Kwon Si-hyeon, the sole grandson and heir in the JK Group conglomerate who bets his life in a dangerous game of love. As he tries to seduce Tae-hee he gradually begins to fall for her.
 Ji Min-hyuk as young Kwon Si-hyeon
 Park Soo-young as Eun Tae-hee, a 20-year-old hardworking college student, who after watching her parents unhappy marriage fall apart, believes that being swayed by love is the most pitiful thing until she meets Si-hyeon.
 Kim Min-jae as Lee Se-ju, a playboy chaebol who is Si-hyeon and Su-ji's best friend and is madly in love with Su-ji but rather has her as his friend as he knows about her feelings towards Si-hyeon.
 Moon Ga-young as Choi Su-ji, the daughter of a hospital director and the initiator of Tae-hee's seduction. She has been Si-hyeon and Se-ju's friend since childhood, but she loves Si-hyeon.
 Kim Min-ju as young Choi Su-ji

Supporting
 Shin Sung-woo as Kwon Seok-woo, Si-hyeon's  father and Seol Young won's old love.
 Jeon Mi-seon as Seol Young-won, Tae-hee's mother.
 Kim Seo-hyung as Myung Mi-ri, an ambitious and established doctor. Su-ji's mother. Kwon Seok Woo's fiancé.
 Jeong Ha-dam as Ko Kyung-joo, Tae-hee's best friend. 
 Moon Hee-kyung as Oh Se-ri, So-joo's Sister-in-law
 Lee Young-jin as Jung Na-yoon, Kyung-ju's mother
 Tae Hang-ho as Priest Matteo
 Kim A-ra as Bing Bing, a maid at Kyung-joo's house.
 Lee Jae-kyun as Lee Gi-young, the spoiled son of a lawyer. His first love is Tae-hee. He still hasn't moved on from Tae hee. He is enemies with the three rich heirs. 
 Kim Do-wan as Yoo Joo-hwan, Hye-jung's boyfriend who is a bartender.
 Oh Ha-nee as Park Hye-jung, the daughter of an F&B CEO, and Gi-young's future fiancée. 
 Shin Chang-joo as Park Gyu-jeong, Hye-jung's brother.
 Jung Hye-sun as Hong Sook-hee, Shi-hyun's grandmother and president of JK Group family

Special appearance
 Han Sun-hwa as Ji-young, Si-hyeon's ex-girlfriend who is a lawyer.
 Yeonwoo as Kwon Yeo-min, Si-hyeon's cousin.

Production
 The series is formerly known as Love Game: The Great Seduction.
 Yeo Jin-goo was first offered the male lead role, but declined.
 The first script reading of the cast was held on January 16, 2018 at MBC Station in Sangam-dong.

Original soundtrack

Part 1

Part 2

Part 3

Part 4

Reception
The series had a mixed reception in South Korea, but was well-received internationally. The drama had an overall Nationwide average audience share of 3.2% according to TNmS and 2.2% according to Nielsen Korea. Internationally, Tempted recorded the highest figure in individual programs since the US-based subscription service Kocowa launched with a peak daily market share of 14.9%, and achieved a rating of 9.3/10 on the global premium licensed streaming site Viki. In South Korea the main criticisms were stated to be the failure of the writer and director to set the genre and script issues. According to the Good Data Corporation survey of TV, Tempted was ranked first place in online video consumption of all dramas airing in South Korea, first in the list of top 10 most talked about dramas, and Park Soo-young and Woo Do-hwan were ranked second and third respectively in the list of top 10 most talked about actors and actresses in South Korea. Despite the question of idol singers in lead roles, Park Soo-young was subsequently praised for her improvement and potential in acting after erasing her idol color as lead actress. Woo Do-hwan was also praised for his ability to express a wide range of emotions in the drama, with the first and second leads commended for inhabiting their characters with the material given.

Ratings

Awards and nominations

Notes

References

External links
  
 Tempted at MBC Global Media
 
 

MBC TV television dramas
2018 South Korean television series debuts
2018 South Korean television series endings
Korean-language television shows
South Korean romance television series
South Korean melodrama television series
Works based on Les Liaisons dangereuses
Television series by Bon Factory Worldwide